Joseph Seeley McCallum (July 9, 1884 – July 22, 1945) was a Canadian politician from Alberta.

Early life
Joseph Seeley McCallum was born July 9, 1884 in Renfrew, Ontario to Angus McCallum and wife Jane Seeley. His family moved to Beaver Lake, Alberta in 1892. He married Catherine Elizabeth McCallum on January 20, 1905.

Political life
McCallum was first elected to the Alberta Legislature in the 1913 Alberta general election. He defeated independent candidate Peter Savarich by a wide and comfortable margin to earn his first term in office. Throughout his career in the Legislature he served as a backbencher in the provincial Liberal government.

McCallum stood for re-election in the 1917 Alberta general election. This time he defeated Conservative candidate Malcolm Gordon to earn his second term in office. In his bid for a third term in office in the 1921 Alberta general election, McCallum would be defeated by Archie Matheson a candidate from the United Farmers of Alberta.

After his defeat from provincial politics McCallum made 2 attempts to gain a seat in the House of Commons of Canada. The first time he ran he was a candidate of Unknown affiliation but most likely ran for the Liberal Party of Canada in the Vegreville in the 1926 Canadian federal election. He was defeated by United Farmers of Alberta candidate Michael Luchovich. McCallum and Luchovich would face each other again in the 1935 Canadian federal election this time both men would be defeated by Social Credit candidate William Hayhurst. He died in Edmonton in 1945.

References

External links

Legislative Assembly of Alberta Members Listing

Alberta Liberal Party MLAs
Candidates in the 1921 Canadian federal election
Candidates in the 1935 Canadian federal election
1884 births
1945 deaths
Liberal Party of Canada candidates for the Canadian House of Commons